Tymon Zaborowski (1799–1828) was a Polish poet. He was influenced at the beginning of his writing career by classicism, then by Romanticism. He is also known, after one of his poems, as "Wieszcz Miodoboru" ("the Bard of the Honey Harvest").

Life
Tymon Zaborowski was born on 18 April 1799 in Lychkivtsi, Podolia. In 1810–16 he attended the Krzemieniec Lyceum. He began writing in 1814 as a member of a student Klub Piśmienniczy (Writing Club).

In 1816–18, in Warsaw, Zaborowski was editor of the literary section of a magazine, Ćwiczenia Naukowe (Scholarly Exercises). Then he settled at the family estate in Liczkowce.

He died in 1828 in Liczkowce. It is unknown whether his death date is 20 or 28 March.

Works
 Tajemnica, czyli Borys i Malwina (1822–24)
 Dumy podolskie za czasów panowania tureckiego w tej ziemi (1830)
 Klub piśmienniczy, a mock-heroic poem

Unfinished poems:
 Zdobycie Kijowa (ca. 1818)
 Bojan (1822), published in Ateneum in 1883

Never-published dramas:
 Bohdan Chmielnicki
 Umwit

Many of his works were published for the first time in Pisma zebrane (Collected Works), 3 volumes, 1936.

See also
List of Poles

Footnotes

References

Further reading
 

Polish male poets
1799 births
1828 deaths
Date of death unknown
19th-century Polish poets
19th-century Polish male writers